Olcott is an unincorporated community and coal town in Kanawha County, West Virginia, United States.  Its post office is closed.

The community was named after one Mr. Olcott, the proprietor of a local mine.

References 

Unincorporated communities in West Virginia
Unincorporated communities in Kanawha County, West Virginia
Coal towns in West Virginia